Cloeon fluviatile is a species of small minnow mayfly in the family Baetidae.

References

Mayflies
Articles created by Qbugbot
Insects described in 1920